In mathematics, the Wiener–Wintner theorem, named after Norbert Wiener and Aurel Wintner, is a strengthening of the ergodic theorem, proved by .

Statement

Suppose that τ is a measure-preserving transformation of a measure space S with finite measure. If f is a real-valued integrable function on S then the Wiener–Wintner theorem states that there is a measure 0 set E such that  the average

exists for all real λ and for all P not in E.

The special case for λ = 0 is essentially the Birkhoff ergodic theorem, from which the existence of a suitable measure 0 set E for any fixed λ, or any countable set of values λ, immediately follows. The point of the Wiener–Wintner theorem is that one can choose the measure 0 exceptional set E to be independent of λ.

This theorem was even much more generalized by
the Return Times Theorem.

References

Ergodic theory